John Harmon Rothchild (May 13, 1945 – December 27, 2019) was a freelance writer specializing in financial matters.  He authored or co-authored more than a dozen books on finance and investing, and served as an editor of Washington Monthly as well as a columnist for Time and Fortune.

Bibliography
Rothchild's financial writings include:
 A Fool and His Money: The Odyssey of an Average Investor (1988: Wiley Investment Classics)
 The Bear Book: Survive and Profit in Ferocious Markets (1998: John Wiley & Sons)
 Going for Broke: How Robert Campeau Bankrupted the Retail Industry, Jolted the Junk Bond Market, and Brought the Booming 80s to a Crashing Halt (2000: Beard Books)
 The Davis Dynasty: Fifty Years of Successful Investing on Wall Street (2003: John Wiley & Sons)

With fellow financial author Peter Lynch, Rothchild wrote:
 One up on Wall Street: How To Use What You Already Know to Make Money in the Market (1989: Published by Simon & Schuster)
 Learn to Earn: A Beginner's Guide to the Basics of Investing and Business (1997: John Wiley & Sons)
 Beating the Street (2003: Simon & Schuster)

Rothchild also assisted Marjory Stoneman Douglas with her autobiography, Voice of the River (2000: Pineapple Press).

Personal
Rothchild married socialite Susan Berns on New Year's Eve in 1976; they had three children, including writer Sascha Rothchild.

References

1945 births
2019 deaths
American financial writers
Peace Corps volunteers
Writers from St. Petersburg, Florida
Yale University alumni